McClure is a surname with several origins. One origin of the name is from the Scottish Gaelic MacGilleUidhir, and Irish Mac Giolla Uidhir, which means "son of the pale one" or "son of the cold one". Another origin of the name is from the Scottish Gaelic MacGilleDheòradha, and the Irish Mac Giolla Dheóradha, which means "son of the servant of the pilgrim".  In the Scottish clan system, McClures are a sept of Clan MacLeod (of Dunvegan).

People with the surname McClure
Alexander McClure (1828-1909), Pennsylvania politician, newspaper editor and writer
Bob McClure, American baseball pitcher and coach
Billy McClure, (William McClure) New Zealand international association football player
Brian McClure, former quarterback for Bowling Green University
Bryton McClure, American actor
Charles L. McClure, American pilot who flew in the Doolittle Raid
Charles McClure, U.S. Representative from Pennsylvania
Daphne McClure, British artist
David McClure, Scottish artist and lecturer
Doug McClure, American actor
Duncan McClure (1913–1991), Scottish footballer
Elliott McClure (1910–1998), American ornithologist
Eric McClure, American race car driver
Floyd Alonzo McClure (1897–1970), American botanist
Gary McClure, American college baseball coach
Hannah McClure, American Christian music singer, part of The McClures
James A. McClure, American politician from the state of Idaho
James H. McClure, British/South African journalist
Jessica McClure, American who was trapped in and rescued from a well
John McClure (disambiguation), several people
Sir John William Maclure, 1st Baronet, British politician
Kandyse McClure, South-African and Canadian actress
Leslie Thompson McClure (1908–1966), Australian pie maker and caterer, see Four'n Twenty
Louise Burton McClure (1916–1997), Canadian-born Israeli artist and designer
Marc McClure, American actor
Mark Maclure, Australian rules footballer
Matt McClure, American journalist and actor
Matt McClure, Northern Irish footballer
Michael McClure (1932–2020), American poet
Mike McClure, American singer/songwriter/producer
Molly McClure, American actress
Nikki McClure, American artist
Patrick McClure AO, Australian CEO and social policy advisor to government 
Paul McClure, American Christian music singer, part of The McClures
Robert McClure, Irish arctic explorer, 1850 expedition
Robert Baird McClure, Canadian physician and clergyman, member of the Order of Canada
Robert A. McClure, American soldier and psychological warfare specialist
Robert B. McClure, American soldier who served in both World Wars and the Korean War
Ruth Adrienne McClure, (1907–1947), American actress better known as Adrienne Ames
Sammy McClure, English footballer
S. S. McClure, American investigative journalist and founder of McClure's Magazine
Steve McClure, British rock climber
Vicky McClure, British actress
Wayne McClure, American football player
Wilbert McClure, American boxer
William Maclure, American geologist
W. Don McClure, American missionary

Fictional people with the surname McClure
Troy McClure, from the American television series The Simpsons
 Fergal MacClure, fictional character in Monarch of the Glen
J.J. McClure, Burt Reynolds's character in The Cannonball Run

See also
The McClures, an American Christian music duo

References

Anglicised Scottish Gaelic-language surnames
Anglicised Irish-language surnames